The British Blues Quintet were a British band formed in 2006 by five musicians,  known for their interpretations of blues music. The line-up included keyboardist and singer Zoot Money, drummer Colin Allen, vocalist Maggie Bell, bassist Colin Hodgkinson and guitarist Miller Anderson. They recorded a live album, Live in Glasgow (Recorded at The Ferry) (2007). As a result of differences due to the participation of some band members in Jon Lord Blues Project, Colin Allen disbanded the British Blues Quintet in 2013.

Discography 

 Live in Glasgow (Recorded at The Ferry) (2007), Angel Air

References 

Musical groups established in 2006
Musical groups disestablished in 2013
British blues musical groups